Daniel Bernard Butler (January 18, 1879) was an American college football coach and politician.
He was the head football coach at Creighton University in 1905. Butler served as the mayor of Omaha, Nebraska from 1936 to 1945.

See also
 History of Omaha, Nebraska
 List of mayors of Omaha, Nebraska

References

1879 births
Year of death missing
Creighton Bluejays football coaches
Creighton University alumni
Mayors of Omaha, Nebraska
People from Ottawa, Illinois